Klaus Böldl (born 21 February 1964) is a German philologist who specializes in Old Norse studies. Böldl was born in Passau and studied Nordic philology, German philology and comparative literature at the universities of Munich and Lund University. Böldl received his Ph.D. in philology at Munich in 1999, where he completed his habilitation in 2005. Since 2007, Böldl has been Professor of Scandinavian Medieval Studies at the Nordic Institute of the University of Kiel.

Böldl is a member of the Akademie der Wissenschaften und der Literatur.

Selected works
 Studie in Kristallbildung. Frankfurt am Main, 1997. .
 (Translator) Die Saga von den Leuten auf Eyr. München, 1999. (= Eyrbyggja saga) .
 Südlich von Abisko. Frankfurt am Main, 2000. .
 Der Mythos der Edda. Tübingen [u. a.], 2000. .
 Die fernen Inseln. Frankfurt am Main, 2003. . (über die Färöer und Island)
 (Co-editor with Uwe Englert) Vereinzelt Schneefall. Neue Texte aus Skandinavien, in: Neue Rundschau Jhg. 115, Heft 3. Frankfurt am Main, 2004. .
 (Co-editor with Miriam Kauko) Kontinuität in der Kritik. Historische und aktuelle Perspektiven der Skandinavistik. Freiburg, 2005. .
 Drei Flüsse. Frankfurt am Main, 2006. .
 Der nächtliche Lehrer. Frankfurt am Main, 2010. .
 (Editor) Isländersagas, S.Fischer Verlag, Frankfurt am Main 2011 .
 Götter und Mythen des Nordens. Ein Handbuch. Verlag C. H. Beck, München 2013, .
 Der Atem der Vögel. Frankfurt am Main, 2017. .

See also
 Wilhelm Heizmann
 Heinrich Beck
 Rudolf Simek
 Robert Nedoma

References

1964 births
People from Passau
Ludwig Maximilian University of Munich alumni
Academic staff of the University of Kiel
German male non-fiction writers
German philologists
Germanic studies scholars
Living people
Old Norse studies scholars
Scandinavian studies scholars
Translators from Old Norse
Writers on Germanic paganism